Emotional spectrum disorder describes a range of conditions classified as mood disorders in the DSM-5, published in 2013. Individuals with emotional spectrum disorder (ESD) include those diagnosed with mood regulating disorders, including:
 Depression
 Bipolar disorder and related conditions including mania
 Persistent anxiety
 Borderline personality disorder
 Adjustment disorder


Commonalities 
In psychoanalytic theory, splitting and transference are frequent and common defense mechanisms among ESD patients. In such cases, the individual is unable regulate emotions over perception of objective reality. When those emotions align with objective reality, it goes unnoticed by others. When such emotions conflict with objective reality, the individual is unable to reconcile the two, and their hyperactive emotions rewrite the events of reality in the individual's mind as if that was the objective reality. The individual thinks "I would not feel this way if events did not occur like this, and given that I feel this way, events must have occurred like this." Once the patient has rationalized their revised perception of reality, additional stimuli challenging that perception typically causes further depression and/or anxiety until such stimuli can be rationalized to fit the patient's revised perception of reality. In advanced cases of such disorders, and especially with bipolar and borderline personality disorders, some patients react to such challenging stimuli with violence to others or even self-harm.

Gender and biology 
Over 25% of women in the United States are actively prescribed antidepressants, anti-anxiety medications, anti-psychotics, or other mood-altering drugs.  Women have been measured as having emotional spectrum disorders at 2.5x greater rates than men. 

One prevailing theory suggests abnormalities in hormone levels during prenatal development causes predisposition to spectrum disorders. Autism spectrum disorder can be compared as hypoactivity of emotions, feelings, and other aspects used in emotive, social communications, while emotional spectrum disorder is the hyperactivity thereof. Abnormally high fetal testosterone is likely to be a cause of autism spectrum disorder, while increased fetal estrogen may cause emotional spectrum disorder. Because males typically have over 10 times the testosterone as females, and autism spectrum is strongly linked to excessive prenatal testosterone, males have significantly higher incidence of autism spectrum disorder than females. Conversely, because females have significantly higher estrogen than males, and emotional spectrum disorder is strongly linked to excessive prenatal estrogen, females have significantly higher incidence of emotional spectrum disorder than males.

References

Mood disorders